13 Delphini is a binary star in the equatorial constellation Delphinus, with a combined apparent magnitude of 5.64.

13 Delphini A has an apparent magnitude of 5.66, while its companion has an apparent magnitude of 8.51.

13 Delphini has a blended stellar classification of A0 V, indicating that it is an ordinary A-type main-sequence star. However, when the components are analysed individually, the primary star is given a class of B9V. It has 2.51 times the mass of the Sun and has an effective temperature of 9,840 K. However, the star is large for its class, having a radius almost 4 times that of the Sun and a luminosity 119 times greater. This is due to 13 Delphini having completed 86.1% of its main sequence lifetime and has led one source to classify it as a subgiant instead.

References

Delphinus (constellation)
A-type main-sequence stars
Delphini, 13
Delphini, 18
BD+05 4613
198069
102633
7953
Binary stars